James Pye (1892 – 23 July 1971) was an Australian rugby league player who played in the 1910s and 1920s.

Personal life
Pye was born at Leichhardt, New South Wales in 1892. He died on 23 July 1971 at Newport, New South Wales.

Playing career
He initially played with the Annandale for two seasons between 1914-1915. After moving to the North Sydney district in 1920, he turned out for  North Sydney during the early 1920s. He played four seasons with North Sydney between 1920-1923, and played prop-forward in the 1922 Grand Final. Jim Pye was the younger brother of the rugby league footballer; Jack Pye.

Pye represented New South Wales reserve team on two occasions in 1919 and 1921 and Metropolis on one occasion in 1922.

References

North Sydney Bears players
Annandale rugby league players
New South Wales rugby league team players
1892 births
1971 deaths
Rugby league props
Date of birth missing
Rugby league players from Sydney